Ahmia is a clearnet search engine for Tor's hidden services created by Juha Nurmi.

Overview 
Developed during the 2014 Google Summer of Code with support from the Tor Project, the open source search engine was initially built in Django and PostgreSQL. It collects the peculiar anonymous identifier called .onion URLs from the Tor network and feeds these to its index except those containing a robots.txt file. The search engine filters out child pornography and keeps a blacklist of abusive services. 

The service partners with GlobaLeaks's submissions and Tor2web statistics for hidden service discovery and as of July 2015 has indexed about 5000 sites. Ahmia is also affiliated with Hermes Center for Transparency and Digital Rights, an organization that promotes transparency and freedom-enabling technologies.

In July 2015 the site published a list  of hundreds of fraudulent fake versions of web pages (including such sites as DuckDuckGo, as well a dark web page). According to Nurmi, "someone runs a fake site on a similar address to the original one and tries to fool people with that" with the intent of scamming people (e.g. gathering bitcoin money by spoofing bitcoin addresses).  The background photo of this site is "Hakaniemi in Helsinki".

References 

Internet search engines
Dark web
Tor onion services